Jerry Bradley (born January 30, 1940) is an American music executive known for his role in country music. As head of RCA Records in Nashville from 1973 to 1982, Bradley was involved in the marketing and creation of the first platinum album in country music, Wanted! The Outlaws, which reached that mark in 1976. Bradley was inducted in the Country Music Hall of Fame in 2019.

Early life
The son of Owen Bradley, who later headed the Decca Records Nashville studios (later MCA Nashville, now part of Universal Music Group), Bradley started his high school years at Montgomery Bell Academy, but then switched to Hillsboro High School over a disagreement with Montgomery Bell and their administration. After graduation, Bradley served two years in the United States Army.

Learning the music business
After his Army discharge, Bradley returned to work with his father Owen at the first Bradley Barn recording studio in Mount Juliet, Tennessee (East of Nashville). He would learn the music business at the Forest Hills Music Studio, the official name of "Bradley's Barn", during the 1960s. While there, Jerry saw the recording of three future Country Music Hall of Fame inductees take place (Brenda Lee, Loretta Lynn, and Webb Pierce). Other artists who recorded at the Bradley Barn during the 1960s were Joan Baez, Gordon Lightfoot, Warner Mack, The Beau Brummels, and Dinah Shore. Some of those sessions lasted until after midnight, forcing Bradley to sleep on a couch at the Bradley Barn to be ready for the next recording session to occur at 9 a.m. the following day.

Transition to RCA
While also at the Bradley Barn, Bradley befriended Chet Atkins of RCA Nashville (now part of Sony Music Group). Atkins, a record producer and head of RCA Nashville, was a creator of the Nashville Sound in the 1960s along with Bradley's father Owen. Bradley told his father about a possible job at RCA Nashville to which Owen replied, "You already have a job." Owen then advised Jerry on the RCA position: "If you aim for another position, make sure it's an opportunity to advance".

RCA Records
Accepting the position as a staff assistant to Chet Atkins of RCA in 1970, Bradley assisted Atkins in communications and paperwork with RCA's main office in New York. Bradley would also assist Atkins in the recording studio. In 1973, Atkins stepped down as head of RCA Nashville following a bout with cancer. Bradley succeeded Atkins in the position. During Bradley's tenure at RCA, he played a role in the early careers of Ronnie Milsap, Dolly Parton, Charley Pride, and Alabama. The biggest role in country music Bradley would play though was in legitimizing the Outlaw movement prevalent during the 1970s, led by Waylon Jennings and Willie Nelson among others. Bradley collected previously recorded songs from Jennings, Nelson, Jessi Colter (Jennings' wife), and Tompall Glaser (the last from Polydor Records); and created them into the album Wanted! The Outlaws with the cover showing it in an Old West poster. Released in 1976, it was the first platinum country music album certified by the Recording Industry Association of America.

Bradley's tenure was also noted for the return of Elvis Presley to country music. Songs such as "Moody Blue" and "Way Down" hit number one on the Billboard country charts prior to Presley's 1977 death. Presley also had six posthumous top-ten hits on those same charts between 1977 and 1981, including "Guitar Man", his final #1 in 1981.

Comedian Ray Stevens recorded three albums while Bradley was in charge of RCA Nashville. Stevens' most notable album was Shriner's Convention with the title track being its most notable song, both in 1980.

After RCA
After stepping down from RCA Records in 1982, Bradley would become head of the Opryland Music Group, an organization created from Gaylord Entertainment's purchase of Acuff-Rose Music in 1985. While at Opryland Music Group, he was head of 16th Avenue records which produced some of Pride's albums after he left RCA. Bradley stayed as head of Opryland Music Group until his 2003 retirement, when Sony Music Group purchased Opryland Music Group's publishing.

Service with CMA
Bradley served as president of the Country Music Association (CMA) Board in 1975. He was also instrumental in the creation of Fan Fair (now the CMA Music Festival) and in managing the historic RCA Studio B in downtown Nashville.

Personal life
Besides Bradley sharing the musical talent of his father Owen, uncle Harold was a well-known session guitarist who was part of the Nashville A-Team players. Bradley's wife Connie worked for the American Society of Composers, Authors, and Publishers (ASCAP) offices in Nashville from 1980 until her 2010 retirement and was CMA Board president in 1989. She died in March 2021. Another uncle, Charlie, and a cousin, Bobby, were noted recording studio engineers. Bradley's aunt Ruby Bradley Strange was a pioneering office manager on Music Row while his sister Patsy was an executive for Broadcast Music, Inc. (BMI). His son Clay is an artist manager. His daughter, Leigh, lives in Canada and manages a fishing resort on Rice Lake.

Honors
In 2019, Bradley was inducted into the Country Music Hall of Fame, in the same year as Brooks & Dunn and Stevens. This made Bradley the third member of his family inducted into the Country Music Hall of Fame, after his father Owen (1974) and uncle Harold (2006).

References

External links
 Country Music Hall of Fame & Museum profile of Jerry Bradley
 

1940 births
Living people
Businesspeople from Tennessee
Musicians from Nashville, Tennessee
Military personnel from Tennessee
United States Army soldiers
20th-century American businesspeople
Country Music Hall of Fame inductees
American music people